New Harbourline is a locality in the Cassowary Coast Region, Queensland, Australia.

History 
North East Harbour Line State School opened on 3 February 1936. It closed in December 1941. The school was located on New Harbourline Road (approx ).

References 

Cassowary Coast Region
Localities in Queensland